The 2004–05 Ohio Bobcats women's basketball team represented Ohio University during the 2004–05 NCAA Division I women's basketball season. The Bobcats, led by seventh year head coach Lynn Bria, in her final year, played their home games at the Convocation Center in Athens, Ohio as a member of the Mid-American Conference. They finished the season 13–16 and 8–7 in MAC play.

Preseason 
The preseason poll was announced by the league office on October 20, 2004. Miami and Eastern Michigan were picked to win their respective divisions.

Schedule

|-
!colspan=9 style=| Non-conference regular season

|-

|-
!colspan=9 style=| MAC regular season

|-
!colspan=9 style=| MAC Tournament

|-

Awards and honors

All-MAC Awards

References

Ohio
Ohio Bobcats women's basketball seasons
Ohio Bobcats women's basketball
Ohio Bobcats women's basketball